For the Winter Olympics, there are 27 venues starting with the letter 'M'. This is the most among all Winter Olympic venues listed alphabetically.

References